Ibatiba, Espírito Santo is a municipality located in the Brazilian state of Espírito Santo. Its population was 26,426 (2020) and its area is 241 km²

References

Municipalities in Espírito Santo